Tinkers Copse is a   Local Nature Reserve  on the northwestern outskirts of Bracknell in Berkshire. It is owned and managed by Bracknell Forest Borough Council. Along with Jock's Copse and Temple Copse it forms part of what is known locally as The Three Copses.

Geography and site
This site is  ancient coppiced woodland, mainly oak and hazel. There is a  badger run from this copse to Temple Copse.

History
In 2002, the site was declared as a local nature reserve by Bracknell Forest Borough Council.

Fauna
The site has the following fauna:

Mammals
European badger
Roe deer
Wood mouse
Eastern gray squirrel

Amphibians and reptiles
Grass snake

Birds
Great spotted woodpecker
Lesser spotted woodpecker
European green woodpecker
Jay
Eurasian bullfinch
European robin
Eurasian blue tit

Invertebrates
Small tortoiseshell

Flora
The site has the following flora:

Trees
Sorbus torminalis
Quercus robur
Corylus avellana
Carpinus betulus

Plants
Primula vulgaris
Lychnis flos-cuculi
Hyacinthoides non-scripta

References

Local Nature Reserves in Berkshire